The House of Trastámara (Spanish, Aragonese and Catalan: Casa de Trastámara) was a royal dynasty which first ruled in the Crown of Castile and then expanded to the Crown of Aragon in the late middle ages to the early modern period.

They were an illegitimate cadet line of the House of Burgundy who acceded to power in Castile in 1369 as a result of the victory of Henry of Trastámara over his half-brother Peter I in the 1351–1369 Castilian Civil War, in which the nobility, and, to a lesser extent, the clergy had played a decisive role in favour of the former. The resulting dynastic change saw a radicalization of the antisemitic sentiment in Castile, converging religious doctrinal anti-Judaism, aristocratic political antisemitism, and popular antisemitism exacerbated by the ongoing economic and social crisis, which had its climax in the 1391 pogroms.

After the succession crisis induced in the neighbouring Crown of Aragon by the death of Martin of Aragon without a legitimate heir, the 1412 Compromise of Caspe installed a member of the house of Trastámara, Ferdinand of Antequera, as monarch.

After the marriage of the Catholic Monarchs (both members of the house of Trastámara), Castile and Aragon came to be ruled under a dynastic union, even if a conflict, the War of the Castilian Succession, was waged between Aragon-supported and Portugal-supported parties over the throne of Castile, which was ensuingly confirmed to Queen Isabella. The dynasty was replaced by the House of Habsburg upon the effective enthronement of Charles V as king of Castile and Aragon in 1516, even though his mentally incompetent and secluded mother Joanna lived until 1555.

14th century: toward unification with Aragon

Peter I and the Rise of Trastámara
Upon the death of the Castilian King Alfonso XI in 1350, his eldest son, Peter, took control of the Castilian throne as Peter I of Castile. Peter was born to Alfonso and his wife, Maria of Portugal, but Alfonso lived out a long and public affair with Eleanor of Guzman.  Alfonso's illegitimate children by Eleanor, known collectively as the Trastámaras, immediately became rivals of the newly crowned Peter. Because of a personal history including political murders, his enemies quickly nicknamed him Peter the Cruel.  Also increasing the hostilities between Peter and his half brothers was the act of Peter's mother taking the opportunity of his power to have Eleanor of Guzman arrested and executed.

Peter first resisted an attempt at his crown by defeating a coalition led by Henry of Trastámara (for whom Peter's half siblings derived their surname) in 1356.  Peter again defeated his rivals at Nájera in 1360 and had his half brothers Juan and Pedro executed.  Having been protected by Aragon, Henry was forced to flee to France when the Castilian crown signed a peace treaty with Aragon in 1360.

Gaining support throughout Castile because of his relation to Alfonso XI and Peter's continuous military escapades, Henry built an alliance with Aragon and France, including mercenaries led by French constable Bertram Du Guesclin for another attempt at the Castilian crown in 1365.  Peter gained the support of Edward the Black Prince, heir to the English throne and son of Edward III of England, to help defend his crown with the promise of territorial gains.  On 13 April 1367, Peter and Edward's forces strongly defeated the armies of Francs, Aragonese, and Castilians led by Henry and captured Bertram Du Guesclin.  As Edward fell ill, and sick with Peter's attempts to get Edward's prisoners executed, and perhaps with Peter's delay or failure to fulfill his promises of land to England, the Plantagenets withdrew from their direct battlefield support of the Castilian Crown to the new front in Gascony opened to the French.  In March 1369, with the continued support of France and Aragon, and growing support in important cities in parts of Castile, Henry's forces again invaded the Castilian Crown's realm and checked Peter's army.  Henry of Trastámara himself was responsible for the death of his brother, Peter I of Castile.

Reign of Henry II
Following his killing of his half brother, Peter I, Henry of Trastámara took control of the crown of Castile as Henry II.  Under Henry, a new nobility rose in prominence to gain land grants of large estates and vast royal privileges.  The public rise of this new class of nobles caused discontent and instability in Castile. This class of nobility was driven by their desire to reclaim family holdings and was generally compelled to use any means necessary. Despite the instability, Henry's forces were able to withstand Portuguese, Navarrese, and Granadian attempts to invade and take control of Castile.

Henry made an agreement with the ruler of Aragon, Peter IV, to have their children wed. Henry's son, John, was married to Peter IV's daughter, Eleanor, on 18 June 1375. This marriage by Henry's son would eventually put the Trastámaras in control of both Castile and Aragon, comprising a majority of the Iberian Peninsula. After giving birth to three children, Eleanor died in 1382, after only seven years of marriage.

The Trastámaras’ rule in several realms
Upon Henry II's death in 1379, his son John came to power as John I of Castile.  During his reign, John took Beatrice, daughter of King Ferdinand I of Portugal, as his second wife.  On the basis of this marriage, John made an unsuccessful claim to the throne of Portugal upon Ferdinand I's death in 1383, a move that possibly could have led to the unification of all of the Iberian Peninsula.  John died very unexpectedly in 1390.

Upon his untimely death, John's eldest son Henry came to the throne as Henry III, at the very young age of twelve.  He waited only two years to independently take control of the throne in 1393 at only fourteen, amidst a great deal of violence being carried out against Jews throughout Castile.  Among the young king's accomplishments was his taking of control of the Canary Islands, providing Castile with a holding in the Atlantic Ocean.  In 1406, amidst an invasion by Granada's forces in Murcia, Henry died while planning a response at the age of 27.

John II, Henry III's son, was left as the only heir upon Henry's death in 1406, but he was only two years old.  Henry's brother, Ferdinand, served as regent, along with John's mother, Catherine of Lancaster.

During his time as regent, Ferdinand was chosen as the ruler of Aragon, due to his maternal relation to the Aragonese throne through the Compromise of Caspe in 1412.  The Trastámaras now ruled in both the realms of Castile and Aragon.

1418–69: Conflict within the House of Trastámara

John II and Don Álvaro

John II came to power upon his mother's death in 1418.  He was now a cousin to the King of Aragon, as Alfonso ascended to the throne upon Ferdinand I's death. John married Maria, the sister of Alfonso V of Aragon.  Alfonso himself had already married John's sister, Maria, making the two rulers both cousins and brothers-in-law twice over.  John II was now also a cousin and brother-in-law to Alfonso's brothers John and Henry, known collectively as the Infantes of Aragon, who had been given large amounts of land in Castile while their father worked as regent during John II's childhood.

John II lacked widespread authority, and Castile became a battlefield for nobles to gain power and political influence.  In 1420, just two years after coming to power, John was kidnapped by his cousin Infante Henry.  Henry ruled on John's behalf for much of the year until John was able to escape because of the help of his friend, and eventual royal favorite, Álvaro de Luna, who was known as Don Alvaro.

In 1429, Alfonso V ordered the Infantes to lead a joint attack on Castile.  Now John II's constable, Don Alvaro, agreed to a basically victorious truce, as the Aragonese branch of Trastámaras was removed from Castile.  John II's authority continued to decline following this military engagement, and he eventually ceded all power to Don Alvaro, who created an oligarchy of nobles.  Don Alvaro lost this power in 1439 to a nobility which was allied with Alfonso V, and in 1443, John II was once again captured by Infante John of Aragon, throwing Castile into near anarchy.  This confusion was settled in 1445, when a group of nobles favoring the monarchy, led by Don Alvaro, won a battle at Olmedo.  Infante Henry was killed as a result of this battle.

In 1453, Don Álvaro was publicly beheaded for charges of tyranny.  In July of the following year, John II died and his son Henry became King Henry IV of Castile.

Henry IV and the rise of Isabella I
Henry IV of Castile was an unpopular ruler, in part because of his taste for Moorish fashion and his disagreement with military engagement with Granada.  He was married at the age of 15 in 1440 to John II of Aragon's daughter, Blanche. John II had succeeded to the throne of Aragon upon the death of his brother Alfonso V of Aragon. This marriage failed, however, as a result of Henry's inability to consummate it.  He was remarried in 1455 to Joan of Portugal.  Queen Joan gave birth to Princess Joan in 1462, and she was recognized by the Cortes as Henry's legitimate successor. In 1464, charges were raised by powerful noble families that Princess Joan was the daughter of one of Henry's favourites, The 1st Duke of Alburquerque.

These powerful noble families eventually forced Henry IV to hand over power to his brother Alfonso in 1465, but Alfonso suddenly died a month later.  Amidst the struggle to settle the ensuing claims to the throne, Henry's wife Joan became pregnant again while being held as a hostage of a noble family.  This sign of misbehavior further weakened her daughter Princess Joan's claim to the throne, and paved the way for Henry's half-sister Isabella to take power.

Pact of the Toros de Guisando and War of Succession
The Pact of the Toros de Guisando was signed in 1468 and named Isabella heir to Henry's throne, as she and the nobles renewed their allegiance to Henry in return.  A quick marriage for Isabella was a condition of the agreement, however Henry objected to her 1469 marriage to Ferdinand, who was the King of Sicily and the heir to the Aragonese throne, as a breach of the pact.  He once again named his daughter Joan as his heir, and a civil war ensued throughout the next decade.  Isabella's military factions were eventually victorious with the help of Aragon, making her queen and uniting the crowns of Aragon and Castile.

Family tree 

Monarchs of Castile: ; monarchs of Aragon: ; monarchs of Navarre: ; monarchs of Castile & Aragon (i.e. Spain): ; monarchs of Naples only: ; 
—————— legitimate children
— — — marriage
........................ liaison and illegitimate children

See also 
 List of Navarrese monarchs from the House of Trastámara
 Navarre monarchs family tree

References

 
Castilian House of Burgundy
Roman Catholic families
Spanish noble families